is a song performed by Japanese singer Naomi Chiaki. It was released as a single from the album of the same name on April 10, 1977 by Nippon Columbia. While the song did not chart as high as other singles, it managed to spawn successful covers in various languages.

Background 
The song was written by Japanese singer-songwriter Miyuki Nakajima, who at the time had written successful singles like "Jidai" and "Wakareuta", and provided music for artists such as Naoko Ken and Junko Sakurada. The song revolves on the topic of loneliness, where a girl from the countryside moves to the city to earn a living, but loses her old self as she grows up.

On the other hand, "Rouge" was the first written piece of the Japanese "new music" genre written for Chiaki, who afterwards released several singles of them, including "Yoru e Isogu Hito" written by Kazuki Tomokawa, and "Amagumo" written by Eigo Kawashima.

Track listing 
All tracks written by Miyuki Nakajima and Kawachi Chito.
 "Rouge"
 "Kaette-oide" ("Come Home")

Faye Wong version 

Hong Kong singer Faye Wong recorded a Cantonese-language cover of the song titled "Vulnerable Woman", appearing on her 1992 album Coming Home.

Background 
Music arranged by Antonio "Tony" Arevalo Jr. It was featured as an interlude song for the Hong Kong television series The Greed of Man. Wong also recorded a Mandarin version titled "Róng Yì Shòu Shāng de Nǚ Rén", which appeared on her 1994 compilation album Faye Best. The cover tells the story of a woman begging her man not to leave.

Reception 
"Vulnerable Woman" achieved success in Hong Kong after its appearance in The Greed of Man, and reportedly led to further covers of the song in various languages.

The song won several awards, including Song of the Year at the 1992 Ultimate Song Chart Awards Presentation held by Commercial Radio Hong Kong.

Accolades 
 1992 Ultimate Song Chart Awards Presentation (Commercial Radio Hong Kong) – Song of the Year
 1992 Ultimate Song Chart Awards Presentation (Commercial Radio Hong Kong) – National Professional Bronze Award
 1992 Jade Solid Gold Best Ten Music Awards Presentation (TVB) – Top Ten Songs
 1992 Jade Solid Gold Best Ten Music Awards Presentation (TVB) – Best Lyricist (Yuen-Leung Poon)
 1992 RTHK Top 10 Gold Songs Awards (RTHK) – Top 10 Songs

Như Quỳnh version 

Vietnamese singer Như Quỳnh recorded a Vietnamese-language cover as her debut single "Người tình mùa đông" (English: "Winter lovers"), appearing on her 1995 debut album Chuyện hoa sim.

Background 
Lyrics were written by songwriter Anh Bằng, who founded Asia Entertainment in 1980, and would proceed to compose music for her signature song "Chuyện hoa sim". The lyrics talk about unrequited love that is generously compared to the coldness of winter. Như Quỳnh first performed "Người tình mùa đông" at the concert Asia 6: Giáng sinh đặc biệt (English: "Asia 6: Christmas special") in 1994, in favor of "Chuyện hoa sim" (which would be performed at the next rendition of the show). The song's performance would later be released on video in 1995.

In September 2014, Như Quỳnh performed an alternate cover titled "Còn mãi mùa đông" (English: "Winter forever") on the 114th edition of the Thúy Nga production Paris by Night, with Vietnamese lyrics written by Thái Thịnh.

Reception 
"Người tình mùa đông" has been considered the song that brought Như Quỳnh to success for overseas Vietnamese music, along with her signature song "Chuyện hoa sim". A 2018 live performance of the song, where Như Quỳnh wore the same outfit from her first performance with Asia Entertainment, received a positive response, including surprise that the singer managed to retain her vocal ability after over twenty years.

Her debut performance of the song was uploaded to YouTube on December 5, 2015, and has since attained over thirteen million views, becoming her most popular song under Asia Entertainment.

Other cover versions 
 Nakajima covered the song herself on her 1979 cover album Okaerinasai.
 Naoko Ken covered the song on her 1984 cover album Again.
 Singaporean band Tokyo Square covered the song in English as "That is Love".
 Jessica Jay covered the song in English as “Broken Hearted Woman”.
Yonca Evcimik covered this song in Turkish as “8:15 Vapuru” (8:15 Ferry).
 Aye Chan May covered the song in Burmese as "Broken as A Piece".
 Don Sonrabiab covered the song in Thai as "Jeb Gwa Thoe" (More sad than you). Later, this song was covered by Pornpimon Tummasarn and was renamed as "Kueab Ja Sai" (Almost too late).
 Tao Chernyim, Thai comedian, covered this song in Thai as "Phu Chai Aok Hak" (ฺBroken Hearted Man).

References

External links 
 "Rouge" on JASRAC (Japanese Society for Rights of Authors, Composers and Publishers) (Search for "ルージュ" in 作品タイトル and "中島　みゆき" in 権利者名)
 Asia 6: Giáng Sinh Đặc Biệt (1994) on YouTube

Japanese-language songs
Songs written by Miyuki Nakajima
1977 singles
Nippon Columbia singles
Miyuki Nakajima songs
Cantonese-language songs
Faye Wong songs
1994 singles